Kim Won-il (born January 3, 1982) is a South Korean boxer best known to win the gold medal in the men's bantamweight division at the Asian Games 2002.

In 2002 he bested Abdusalom Khasanov and Bekzod Khidirov in the final.

At the 2004 Summer Olympics he lost his first match to eventual Thai runner up Worapoj Petchkoom.

At the 2005 World Championships he competed in the featherweight division, and lost his first bout to Dmytro Bulenkov (Ukraine).

References

2002

1982 births
Living people
Bantamweight boxers
Olympic boxers of South Korea
Boxers at the 2004 Summer Olympics
Asian Games medalists in boxing
Boxers at the 2002 Asian Games
South Korean male boxers
Asian Games gold medalists for South Korea
Medalists at the 2002 Asian Games